The 2010–11 ECAC Hockey women's ice hockey season  marked the continuation of the annual tradition of competitive ice hockey among ECAC members.

Exhibition

PWHL is Provincial Women's Hockey League in Ontario, Canada

Season standings

Regular season

News and notes
October 15–16: Regan Boulton of Quinnipiac registered three goals and two assists. In a 4-2 win versus the Maine Black Bears, she registered her first-career hat trick.
November 10: Former Harvard player Angela Ruggiero will serve on the evaluation commission that will inspect the three cities competing to host the 2018 Olympic Winter Games. She will be one of four Americans on the 11-member panel that will travel to potential host cities for on-site inspections from February 8-March 5, 2011.
November 12–13: Kelly Babstock made Quinnipiac hockey history as she accounted for six of the seven goals scored over the weekend. Babstock registered back to back hat tricks against ECAC opponents (No. 10 ranked Harvard and Dartmouth). In addition, she is the first skater in Quinnipiac history to record two hat tricks in one season. As of November 14, Babstock led the team and the entire NCAA in goals (13) and points (27).
On Friday, Dec. 3 against Brown, Kelly Babstock became Quinnipiac's all-time leader in goals scored in a season by netting her 16th goal of the season. Babstock's nation leading sixth game-winning goal against Yale on Saturday, Dec. 4 was part of a Bobcats 3-1 win.
December 10: Vanessa Emond accumulated four points (two goals, two assists) as the Skating Saints upset the Mercyhurst Lakers. She scored the opening goal of the game at 6:34 on the power play. In the second period, she would score another goal to extend the lead to 5-0. The four point effort was a career high for Emond.
December 14: Quinnipiac women's ice hockey assistant coach Cassandra Turner was selected to serve as assistant coach for Canada at the 2011 IIHF World Women's Under-18 Championship.
January 7–8: Cornell freshman goaltender Lauren Slebodnik earned two shutouts in her first two career starts. On January 7, she made her NCAA debut by shutting out Yale by a 5-0 margin. With Cornell dressing just 12 skaters, she stopped all 23 Yale shots. The following night, Slebodnik shut out the Brown Bears by a 3-0 mark. Cornell only dressed 11 skaters for the game and she stopped all 15 shots.
January 8: Quinnipiac forward Kelly Babstock scored a hat trick, including the game-winning marker at 3:25 in overtime. Her goal lifted the Bobcats to a come from behind victory over ECAC Hockey opponent Clarkson.
In February 2011, three months after the passing of Daron Richardson, the Yale Bulldogs were inspired to raise awareness of youth mental health issues. Freshman forward Jenna Ciotti played with Daron’s sister, Morgan on the Ottawa Senators of the PWHL. In addition, Ciotti was also coached by Daron’s father, Luke Richardson. The Bulldogs’ support for the Do It For Daron charity was symbolized by the purple wristbands the club wore during the month of February and March in the 2010–11 Yale Bulldogs women's ice hockey season. She played on the PWHL Senators with Morgan Richardson (under Luke Richardson’s coaching) for two seasons. Ciotti wanted the bracelets to keep Daron's spirit alive and support the Richardson family.

National rankings

In season honors

MLX Skates Players of the week
Throughout the conference regular season, ECAC Hockey offices names a player of the week each Monday.

Defensive Players of the week

Rookies of the week
Throughout the conference regular season, ECAC Hockey offices names a rookie of the week each Monday.

Postseason
March 18: Cornell participated in the NCAA women's Frozen Four. In the semi-final, the Big Red were bested by the Boston University Terriers women's ice hockey program by a 4-1 tally.

Postseason awards and honors
Kelly Babstock, Quinnipiac, 2010-11 ECAC Player of the Year
Kelly Babstock, Quinnipiac, 2010-11 ECAC Rookie of the Year
Doug Derraugh, Cornell, ECAC Coach of the Year
Regan Fisher, Dartmouth and Karlee Overguard, Cornell: ECAC co-Defensive Forward of the Year
Lauriane Rougeau, ECAC top Defensive Defenseman
Jackee Snikeris, Yale, 2010-11 ECAC Goaltender of the Year
Jackee Snikeris, 2010-11 ECAC Women's Student-Athlete of the Year
Jackee Snikeris, 2011 Sarah Devens Award

All-ECAC honors

First team
Forward: Kelly Babstock, Quinnipiac
Forward: Rebecca Johnston, Cornell
Forward: Brianne Jenner, Cornell
Defense: Laura Fortino, Cornell
Defense: Lauriane Rougeau, Cornell
Goaltender: Jackie Snikeris, Yale

Second team
Forward: Chelsea Karpenko, Cornell
Forward: Jillian Dempsey, Harvard
Forward: Kelly Foley, Dartmouth
Defense: Josephine Pucci, Harvard
Defense: Sasha Sherry, Princeton
Goaltender: Rachel Weber, Princeton

Third team
Forward: Catherine White, Cornell
Forward: Kelly Sabatine, St. Lawrence
Forward: Liza Ryabkina, Harvard
Defense: Sasha Nanji, Dartmouth
Defense: Leanna Coskren, Harvard
Goaltender: Victoria Vigilanti, Quinnipiac

All-rookie team
Forward: Kelly Babstock, Quinnipiac
Forward: Brianne Jenner, Cornell
Forward: Carly Mercer, Clarkson
Defense: Alyssa Gagliardi, Cornell
Defense: Marissa Gedman, Harvard
Goaltender: Erica Howe, Clarkson

All-Americans

First Team 
 Laura Fortino, Cornell

Second Team
 Lauriane Rougeau, Cornell
 Rebecca Johnston, Cornell

2011 ECAC Women's Ice Hockey Tournament

Note: The chart indicates the number of games won in the tournament and not the actual scores.

See also 
 National Collegiate Women's Ice Hockey Championship
 2010–11 CHA women's ice hockey season
 2010–11 WCHA women's ice hockey season
 2010–11 Hockey East women's ice hockey season
 ECAC women's ice hockey

References

External links 

ECAC
ECAC Hockey